DeAndre Tremaine Smelter (born December 3, 1991) is a former American football wide receiver. He played college football at Georgia Tech.

College career
Smelter originally was drafted by the Minnesota Twins of Major League Baseball in 2010, but turned it down to play college baseball at Georgia Tech. In 2011, he played collegiate summer baseball with the Falmouth Commodores of the Cape Cod Baseball League. After playing three seasons of baseball from 2011 to 2013, primarily as a relief pitcher, shoulder problems caused him to turn to football. Smelter went on to play two seasons as a starting wide receiver for the Georgia Tech Yellow Jackets edging out Darren Waller on the depth chart. However, on November 29, 2014, in the traditional year ending rivalry game against the University of Georgia, Smelter tore his ACL.

Professional career

San Francisco 49ers
Smelter was drafted by the San Francisco 49ers in the fourth round of the 2015 NFL Draft, 132nd overall.

On September 3, 2016, he was released by the 49ers. He was re-signed to the practice squad on October 18, 2016. He was promoted to the active roster on December 20, 2016. In Week 17, Smelter caught his first career reception from Colin Kaepernick against the Seattle Seahawks on January 1, 2017, which went for 23 yards and a first down.

On September 2, 2017, Smelter was waived by the 49ers and was signed to the practice squad the next day.

Indianapolis Colts
On January 17, 2018, Smelter signed a reserve/future contract with the Indianapolis Colts. He was waived on May 11, 2018.

Jacksonville Jaguars
On June 15, 2018, Smelter signed with the Jacksonville Jaguars. He was waived on September 1, 2018.

References

1991 births
Living people
American football wide receivers
Baseball pitchers
Falmouth Commodores players
Georgia Tech Yellow Jackets baseball players
Georgia Tech Yellow Jackets football players
Indianapolis Colts players
Jacksonville Jaguars players
Players of American football from Georgia (U.S. state)
San Francisco 49ers players
Sportspeople from Macon, Georgia